László Vaskúti is a Hungarian sprint canoeist who competed from the late 1970s to the mid-1980s. He won five medals in the C-2 10000 m event at the ICF Canoe Sprint World Championships with three golds (1978, 1981, 1983) and two bronzes (1979, 1982).

References

Hungarian male canoeists
Living people
Year of birth missing (living people)
ICF Canoe Sprint World Championships medalists in Canadian
20th-century Hungarian people